Roni Shimrich (born 15 August 1993) is an Israeli footballer who plays as a midfielder and has appeared for the Israel women's national team.

Career
Shimrich has been capped for the Israel national team, appearing for the team during the 2019 FIFA Women's World Cup qualifying cycle.

References

External links
 
 
 

1993 births
Living people
Israeli women's footballers
Israel women's international footballers
Women's association football midfielders
Israeli Ashkenazi Jews